Synaphe dresnayi is a species of moth of the family Pyralidae. It was described by Patrice J.A. Leraut in 2005. It is found in Korea.

References

Moths described in 2005
Pyralini